Panther Creek is a stream in the U.S. state of West Virginia. It is a tributary of the Tug Fork.

Panther Creek was named from an incident when a pioneer killed a panther there.

See also
List of rivers of West Virginia

References

Rivers of McDowell County, West Virginia
Rivers of West Virginia